Quế Ngọc Hải (born 15 May 1993) is a Vietnamese professional footballer who plays as a defender for V.League 1 club Sông Lam Nghệ An and the Vietnam national team.

He scored his first goal for Vietnam in the 2014 AFF Championship in a 2–2 draw with Indonesia.

Club career

Trần Anh Khoa incident 
In a match on 13 September 2015, between Sông Lam Nghệ An and SHB Đà Nẵng a player from the latter team, Trần Anh Khoa, was dribbling into the box at the 21st minute when Ngọc Hải committed a dangerous and reckless tackle to stop the winger. Ngọc Hải was only shown a yellow card by the referee but Anh Khoa had to be substituted and suffered serious injury to his knee ligaments and leg bone because of the tackle. Ngọc Hải was later suspended for 6 months for all football-related activities, and was ordered to pay the roughly 800 million đồng for Anh Khoa's medical expenses. Anh Khoa is expected to remain injured for 12 to 18 months and had to travel to Singapore for surgery. Doctors said that there was only a 50% chance of Anh Khoa recovering enough to play professional football again.

Finally, this incident ends Anh Khoa's football career, his leg never recovers well enough to play football again.

International career

International goals

U-23

Vietnam
Scores and results list Vietnam's goal tally first.

Personal life
Ngọc Hải was born in Diễn Châu District. At an early age, due to financial difficulties, he moved to Vinh, where his parents made a living as fruit sellers. Ngọc Hải and his older brother Ngọc Mạnh are very close and attended the Sông Lam Nghệ An football academy together. Ngọc Mạnh suffered a serious knee injury however, and with little money the family had to rely on Ngọc Hải to work hard and become professional, both to provide for his family and pay for his brothers surgery.

After scoring the opening goal against Indonesia in the 2014 AFF Suzuki Cup Ngọc Hải lifted his shirt to reveal a picture of Nguyễn Hữu Thắng to thank his former coach for the opportunities he gave him.

Honours
Sông Lam Nghệ An
Vietnamese National Cup: 2017
Viettel
V.League 1: 2020  
Vietnam 
AFF Championship: 2018; runners-up: 2022
AYA Bank Cup: 2016
VFF Cup: 2022

Individual
 ASEAN Football Federation Best XI: 2019

References

External links 

1985 births
Living people
Vietnamese footballers
Vietnam international footballers
People from Nghệ An province
Song Lam Nghe An FC players
V.League 1 players
Association football defenders
Footballers at the 2014 Asian Games
2019 AFC Asian Cup players
Southeast Asian Games bronze medalists for Vietnam
Southeast Asian Games medalists in football
Competitors at the 2015 Southeast Asian Games
Asian Games competitors for Vietnam
Hoa people